Paraa is a location in Northern Uganda.

Location
Paraa is located in Nwoya District, Acholi sub-region, in Northern Uganda. The coordinates of Paraa are:02 18 00N, 31 33 00E (Latitude:2.3000; Longitude:31.5500).

Overview
Built in the early 1950s, Paraa, meaning the place of hippos in Luo, is one of the main attractions of the park, in addition to the dramatic Murchison Falls and the large variety of bird and animal species.

Paraa is the location of Paraa Safari Lodge, a facility with 60 rooms and suites, located on a hill on the northern bank of the river, overlooking the River Nile and in close proximity to the Murchison Falls themselves. Amenities include a large swimming pool, a restaurant, a bar, en-suite bathrooms and balconies on all rooms. The facility, having been destroyed during the reign of Idi Amin in the 1970s, has now been restored and is currently managed by the Madhvani Group, who also manage Mweya Safari Lodge in Queen Elizabeth National Park. Paraa Safari Lodge itself hosted the Queen Mother in the 1950s and by the 1960s it had attained mass popularity.

In 1864, the explorer Samuel Baker,  wrote of "a magnificent sight" suddenly bursting upon his party. Other famous visitors to the park were Emin Pasha, Theodore Roosevelt and the American novelist Ernest Hemingway, whose plane dipped to catch sight of the Murchison Falls, went too low and caught a telephone wire and crashed. He and his wife survived the crash.

Landmarks
The landmarks within or near Paraa include:

 Paraa Safari Lodge - A private safari lodge operated by the Madhvani Group

Photos
 Photos of Paraa at Google.com
 Photo of Paraa Safari Lodge

See also
 Nwoya District
 Murchison Falls National Park
 Murchison Falls
 Acholi sub-region
 Northern Region, Uganda

References

External links
 Profile of Murchison Falls National Park
 Paraa Safari Lodge Homepage
 About Paraa Safari Lodge

Nwoya District
Populated places in Northern Region, Uganda
Cities in the Great Rift Valley
Populated places on the Nile